Paulo Jorge Pedro Lopes (born 29 June 1978) is a Portuguese former footballer who played as a goalkeeper, and is a goalkeeping coach of Benfica.

He appeared in 81 Primeira Liga matches over 14 seasons, representing Benfica, Gil Vicente, Estrela da Amadora, Trofense and Feirense. Despite having played only 11 matches for the first club, he won 12 trophies with them always as third-choice.

Lopes added 150 appearances in the Segunda Liga, in a 21-year professional career.

Club career
Born in Mirandela, Bragança District, Lopes joined S.L. Benfica's youth system at the age of 15, being promoted to the first team four years later and going on to serve two loans in his first two years as a senior. On 19 February 2000, while at the service of Gil Vicente FC, he made his Primeira Liga debut, coming on as a second-half substitute in an eventual 1–1 away draw against Sporting CP after Paulo Jorge was sent off.

In June 2002, Lopes was released by Benfica. He alternated between the top division and the Segunda Liga in the following decade, notably achieving promotions to the former competition with C.D. Trofense (2007–08) and C.D. Feirense (2010–11); during his stint with the former, on 4 January 2009, he was on goal to help the hosts defeat his parent club 2–0, in an eventual relegation-ending season.

Lopes returned to the Estádio da Luz in the summer of 2012, aged 34. He went on to act as third goalkeeper under several managers, collecting three league winners' medals by appearing in matches after his team had already been crowned champions; he made his competitive debut on 18 October 2012, in a 4–0 away win over S.C. Freamunde for the Taça de Portugal.

Lopes retired at the end of the 2017–18 campaign, being immediately appointed goalkeeper coach of Benfica's newly created under-23 team. On 16 January 2019, in the same capacity, he joined the reserve side.

Personal life
Lopes is the father of the Portuguese footballer André Lopes.

Honours

Club
Trofense
Segunda Liga: 2007–08
Benfica
Primeira Liga: 2013–14, 2015–16, 2016–17
Taça da Liga: 2013–14
Supertaça Cândido de Oliveira: 2014, 2016, 2017

Individual
Segunda Liga Goalkeeper of the Year: 2010–11

References

External links

 
 
 
 

1978 births
Living people
Sportspeople from Bragança District
People from Mirandela
Portuguese footballers
Association football goalkeepers
Primeira Liga players
Liga Portugal 2 players
Segunda Divisão players
S.L. Benfica footballers
Gil Vicente F.C. players
F.C. Barreirense players
S.L. Benfica B players
S.C. Salgueiros players
C.F. Estrela da Amadora players
C.D. Trofense players
C.D. Feirense players
Portugal youth international footballers
Portugal under-21 international footballers
Portugal B international footballers
S.L. Benfica non-playing staff